Animashree (Anima) Anandkumar is the Bren Professor of Computing at California Institute of Technology. She is a director of Machine Learning research at NVIDIA. Her research considers tensor-algebraic methods, deep learning and non-convex problems.

Education and early career 
Anandkumar was born in Mysore. Her parents are both engineers, and her grandfather was a mathematician. Her great-great-grandfather was the Sanskrit scholar R. Shamasastry. She began to study Bharatanatyam and she learnt this style of dancing for many years. She studied electrical engineering at the Indian Institute of Technology Madras and graduated in 2004. She joined Cornell University for her graduate studies, earning a PhD under the supervision of Lang Tong in 2009. Her first project looked at distributed statistical estimation. She was an IBM Fellow at Cornell University between 2008 and 2009. Her thesis considered Scalable Algorithms for Distributed Statistical Inference. During her PhD she worked in the networking group at IBM on end-to-end service-level transactions. She was a postdoctoral scholar at Massachusetts Institute of Technology until 2010, where she worked in the Stochastic Systems Group with Alan Willsky.

Research 
In 2010 Anandkumar joined University of California, Irvine, as an assistant professor. At the time, the technology industry was at the beginning of the big data revolution. Here she started working on tensor decompositions of latent variable models. She joined Microsoft Research in New England as a visiting scientist in 2012. In 2013 she was awarded a National Science Foundation CAREER Award to investigate big data and social networks. She was made an assistant professor with tenure at UC Irvine in 2016.  She specialised in large-scale machine learning and high-dimensional statistics. Anandkumar was a Principal Scientist at Amazon Web Services from 2016 to 2018. She worked with the Apache MXNet tool, introducing new functionality and developing multi-modal processing algorithms. She represented Amazon Web Services at the Anita Borg Institute in 2017, the Mulan forum for Chinese women entrepreneurs and Shaastra in 2018, discussing Deep Learning. She also worked on Amazon Rekognition, Amazon Lex and Amazon Polly. She was involved with the launch of Amazon SageMaker, an opportunity for developers to use machine learning models.
Anandkumar joined the Machine Learning Conference Board of Advisors in 2018. In 2018 Anandkumar joined NVIDIA as Director of Machine Learning Research, and Caltech as the Bren Professor of Computing and Mathematical Sciences. At NVIDIA she opened a new core laboratories in artificial intelligence and machine learning in Santa Clara. She has pushed for governments to invest in robotics and artificial intelligence. She spoke at the 2018 TEDxIndiana University about the algorithms she has developed to process big data.

Diversity in technology
Anandkumar is committed to improving diversity in the technology sector. She launched a petition to Timothy A. Gonsalves to try and convince him at the Ministry of Human Resource Development to end gender segregation in the admissions process at the Indian Institute of Technology Madras. The petition calls for campus-wide systems to monitor sexual harassment, improved campus security and increased engagement with alumni. She has spoken openly about her own experiences of sexual harassment on social media and called for Intel to stop using female acrobats as entertainment at their conference parties. She was one of several campaigners to rename the Conference on Neural Information Processing Systems 'NIPS' as NeurIPS. In 2018 she was awarded a New York Times Good Tech Award.

Controversies 

In December 2020, Anandkumar was embroiled in a Twitter controversy, when she published a list of individuals who allegedly followed, liked or supported any Tweets made by Prof Pedro Domingos allegedly in relation to his controversial views on the renaming of NeurIPS, Timnit Gebru's controversial exit at Google, algorithmic bias or cancel culture, or simply followed him on Twitter. She never clarified how she actually came up with that list. She suggested that followers "try and change the mind of [these] fanboys of Pedro[...] Especially junior people". Following prompt backlash from individuals concerned about the circulation of such a blacklist, Anandkumar deactivated her Twitter account temporarily and issued an apology stating "I am by no means perfect. I am sorry if my actions/words have ever created a threatening environment. My intention was to change hearts and minds, and to raise awareness to the struggles that women and minorities face both online and in the real world. I will find better ways to achieve that goal".

Awards and honors 
Anandkumar has won several awards and honours, including:
 2022 ACM Fellow
 2020 IEEE Fellow
 2020 Women in AI research award by Venturebeat
 2017 Caltech Bren Chair
 2015 Google Research Award
 2015 Air Force Office of Scientific Research Young Investigator Award
 2015 University of California, Irvine Early Career Research Award
 2014 Sloan Research Fellowship
 2013 Microsoft Faculty Fellowship
 2013 Army Research Office Young Investigator Award
 2013 National Science Foundation CAREER Award
 2011 ACM SIGMETRICS Best Paper Award
 2009 ACM SIGMETRICS Best Thesis Award
 2008 IEEE Signal Processing Society Best Paper Award

References 

Year of birth missing (living people)
Living people
American women computer scientists
American computer scientists
Indian computer scientists
IIT Madras alumni
Cornell University alumni
University of California, Irvine faculty
California Institute of Technology faculty
Machine learning researchers
Nvidia people
American women academics
21st-century American women
Fellows of the Association for Computing Machinery